Subrata Mukherjee (born 12 October 1942, in Dalkhola, West Dinajpur district,
(West Bengal)) is a leader of  Communist Party of India (Marxist) from  West Bengal.

He served as member of the Lok Sabha representing Raiganj (Lok Sabha constituency). He was elected to 10th, 11th, 12th and 13th Lok Sabha.

References

India MPs 1996–1997
1942 births
Living people
India MPs 1998–1999
India MPs 1991–1996
Lok Sabha members from  West Bengal
Communist Party of India (Marxist) politicians from West Bengal